The Ministry of Agriculture and Food Security in South Sudan is a ministry in the current Revitalised Transitional Government of National Unity. The sitting minister is Ms Josephine Joseph Lagu, daughter of veteran politician, Joseph Lagu while Lily Albino Akol Akol  serves as the Deputy Minister of Agriculture and Food Security.

List of Ministers of Agriculture and Food Security

References

Agriculture and Forestry
South Sudan
South Sudan, Agriculture and Forestry
South Sudan
South Sudan
South Sudan
Agriculture in South Sudan
Agricultural organizations based in Africa